Mathieu Rock is an ice-free rock, midway between Cape Bickerton and Rock X, at the east side of the entrance to Victor Bay, Antarctica. It was photographed from the air by U.S. Navy Operation Highjump, 1946–47 and charted by the French Antarctic Expedition, 1952–53, under Marret. The rock was named for Mathieu Rivolier, born 29 April 1952, the son of the French doctor of the Antarctic expedition Jean Rivolier .

References

Rock formations of Adélie Land